The fourth and final season of the Chinese reality talent show The Voice of China premiered on 17 July 2015 on Zhejiang Television. Hu Qiaohua continued his role as host, while Na Ying and Wang Feng returned for their fourth and third consecutive seasons as coaches, respectively. Former coach Harlem Yu, who returned after a one-season absence, and Jay Chou joined the coaching panel following the departures of Chyi Chin and Yang Kun.

For this season, the team sizes were reduced to 12 per team, down from 16 last season. Due to the possibility of having multiple potential winners on the same team, this season would see the show moving to a format more similar to the American version of the show. In the Playoff rounds, the final 16 would compete against each other, with the eliminations adjusted to eliminate contestants who earned the lowest number of votes, regardless of which team they are in, thus not guaranteeing a coach and an artist in the finals. Also, the number of finalists increased from four to five.

On 7 October 2015, Zhang Lei of Team Na Ying was announced as the winner of the season, with Tifa Chen of Team Jay as runner-up. Tan Xuanyuan of Team Harlem, Beibei of Team Wang Feng, and Leon Lee of Team Jay finished in third, fourth, and fifth place respectively. This season is also Na Ying's third win throughout the series of the show.

Coaches and hosts

The coaching panel once again saw a change as Na Ying and Wang Feng were rejoined by Harlem Yu, who returned from a one-season hiatus. The trio was joined by Jay Chou, who was a new addition to the panel. Chyi Chin and Yang Kun did not return from the previous season. Hu Qiaohua returned as host.

Individuals rumoured to serve as the advisors for this season included A-mei, Eason Chan, G.E.M. and Li Jian. On 14 August 2015, it was revealed on the final episode of the blind auditions that G.E.M. would be serving as the advisor for Team Wang Feng, Li for Team Na Ying, JJ Lin for Team Harlem and A-mei for Team Jay.

Teams
 Colour key

Blind auditions
The taping of the blind auditions began on 17 June 2015, and ended on 5 August 2015.

This season saw the introduction of the "double-blind auditions", which gave some of the artists the opportunity (or requested by the producers) to perform behind a translucent blind on stage, and only reveal themselves to the coaches and audiences after their performances. The "double-blind auditions" format was featured on the show on episode two and four for Lin Yan's and Tong Yushuo's performances respectively.

 Colour key

Episode 1 (17 July)
The four coaches performed a medley of each other's songs – Na Ying performed Jay Chou's "青花瓷", Wang Feng performed Harlem Yu's "春泥", Chou performed Na's "默", and Yu performed Wang's "一起摇摆".

Episode 2 (24 July)
Season one runner-up Momo Wu returned to the stage to perform "舞底线", a soundtrack from the film Monster Hunt.

Episode 3 (31 July)

Episode 4 (7 August)

Episode 5 (14 August)
This episode was dubbed as the "finale of the blind auditions", which featured mostly rejected artists (who failed to get any chair-turn on their first try) returning to compete in the revival round. The revival round was brought in after all the 150 artists has performed, and all teams were still left with vacancies the coaches failed to fill up with. Harlem Yu and Wang Feng were left with one spot in their teams, while Na Ying and Jay Chou were left with two.

The Battles
The taping of the Battle rounds (together with the Knockout rounds) began on 17 August 2015 for Team Wang Feng, and later on 19 August 2015 for Team Jay. Team Na Ying's and Team Harlem's episodes were taped on 23 and 25 August 2015, respectively. The Battles were featured on the first half of the episodes aired on 21, 28 August and 6, 11 September 2015.

Season four's advisors are G.E.M. for Team Wang Feng, A-mei for Team Jay, Li Jian for Team Na Ying and JJ Lin for Team Harlem. Continuing with the format used in the previous seasons, coaches of the other teams and the respective team advisor were allowed to provide recommendations to the team coach on who they should advance to the next round. However, the recommendations would not have an effect on the outcome of the results as the final decisions lie solely on the team coaches themselves. Artists who won their battle will advance to the Knockout rounds.

Arnold Schwarzenegger made a brief appearance at the start of the sixth episode to announce the commencement of the Battle rounds, as part of the promotional efforts for the film Terminator Genisys.

 Colour key

The Knockouts
The Knockouts, which were taped together with the Battles, were featured on the second half of the episodes aired on 21, 28 August and 6, 11 September 2015. Similar to the Battles, coaches of the other teams and the respective team advisor were allowed to provide recommendations to the team coach on who they should advance to the next round, and once again they would not have an effect of the final outcome.

A new element was added in this season where each of the coaches were given one "double selection" power to save both contestants of a Knockout pair from elimination and advance them to the next round of competition. The top 16 contestants will then move on to the Playoffs.

 Colour key

The Playoffs and live show
The Playoffs began on 18 September and comprised episodes 10, 11, and 13, aired over three weeks. They were followed by the live show on the fourth week, the final phase of the competition.

From this point on in the competition, unlike previous seasons where the artists would compete against their own team members in the Playoffs for a spot in the finals, the remaining artists went head-to-head against artists from the other teams, which introduced the possibility of having a group of finalists without equal team representation.

Week 1–2: The Cross Battles (18, 25 September)
The first two weeks of the Playoff rounds saw the introduction of a brand new competition format, the Cross Battles, where the coaches had to compete with an opposing coach with their remaining artists. Through the drawing of lots, it was decided that Team Na Ying would go against Team Jay in the tenth episode, and Team Wang Feng would battle with Team Harlem in the eleventh.

In a Cross Battle, an artist would be sent by his or her coach to compete against an artist from the opposing team. The selection of the artists and their order of appearance were all decided by their respective coaches, and all of which were done without the knowledge of the opposing coach. Therefore, the battle pairings were completely by random, and would only be revealed when the coaches appeared with their selected artist on stage. At the end of each Cross Battle round, the artist receiving the most votes from the media judging panel would advance to the next Playoff round. The 51-person media judging panel was made up of 26 veteran record producers and music critics, together with 25 media practitioners from various media companies, and each of them was entitled to one vote per battle pairing.

Each of the coaches was allowed to save one losing artist from their respective team, and they had to decide on the spot if they would like to exercise the power on the artist once he or she was announced as the loser of a battle. If the losing coach decides not to, the artist would be immediately eliminated. The two artists that were saved by the coaches (one from each team) would then perform again in the "coach's save" round, with the one receiving the most media votes moving on to the Top 10. In the event when there was only one saved contestant as the opposing coach failed to exercise his or her power, the only saved contestant would be given walkover and automatically advance to the next round without having to perform again.

 Colour key

Week 3: Top 10 (30 September)
The Top 10 performed on the third week of the Playoffs for a spot in the finals. The order of appearance was decided through the drawing of lots by the coaches. In deciding who moves on, a professional judging panel made up of 27 veteran record producers and music critics, as well as the studio audience made up of 360 members of the public (including media practitioners from various media companies) were given an equal say. Each of the voters was entitled to one vote per artist, and they can either choose to vote or not vote for a particular artist. The total number of votes cast by the professional judging panel and studio audience were converted into points accordingly to the weightage (50% each). The five artists with the highest accumulated total points would advance to the finals.

The cast of Lost in Hong Kong Xu Zheng, Bao Bei'er, Du Juan, and the theme songwriter Zhao Yingjun made an appearance at the start of the show to promote the film. Xu and Zhao also participated in the "double-blind auditions", with Na Ying and Wang Feng hitting their "I WANT YOU" buttons for the performance.

 Colour key

Week 4: Finals (7 October)
The Top 5 performed in the two-part season finale on 7 October 2015, held at the Beijing National Stadium. In the first round of the competition, the five finalists performed a duet with their respective coach, then a solo song. Based on the public votes received from the live audience at the end of the first round, the bottom three artists with the fewest votes were eliminated.

The final two artists then sang their winner's song in the second round of the competition, with the 101-person media judging panel and live audience voting for the winner. Every member of the media judging panel was entitled to one vote, and each vote represents one point. The public votes received from the live audience were converted into points based on the total number of the votes received by the final two contestants. The artist who received the highest accumulated total points was announced as the winner.

  The performance featured coach Na Ying as the guest backing vocalist.
  The performance featured fellow team members Sharon Kwan 关诗敏 and Jiang Yuandong 江源东 as the instrumentalists for Erhu and Dizi respectively.
  Tifa Chen 陈梓童 received 8,880 votes in the first round, and accumulated 15,986 votes by the end of second round. 
  Zhang Lei 张磊 received 11,773 votes in the first round, and accumulated 23,871 votes by the end of second round.
  Due to technical difficulties, only 97 members of the media judging panel managed to cast their votes.

Non-competition shows

The Mid-Autumn Special (27 September)
The twelfth episode was a two-hour special episode aired on 27 September 2015, featuring performances by the coaches and artists from the current and past seasons in celebration of the Mid-Autumn Festival. Besides paying tribute and giving thanks to artists' family members and coaches, this episode gave a special mention to the late Bella Yao, a season two artist who died on 16 January 2015. The episode was taped on 21 September 2015, at The Venetian Theatre.

The Battle of Glory (16 October)
For the first time in the show's history, the Top 5 artists of the current season were pit against the team of returning artists from the previous seasons for the honour of the "Golden Team", dubbed as the "highest glory" of the show. The current season's team, named "地表最强战队", were led by Na Ying and Jay Chou; while Harlem Yu and Wang Feng took charge of the previous seasons' team, which called themselves the "回归者联盟".

There were five rounds of competition, and in each round the team coaches would send out one of their team members to compete against a team member from the opposing team. The order of appearance were decided randomly by the team coaches prior to the start of the show. At the end of each round, the studio audience made up of 600 members of the public would vote for their favourite performance among the two. With 1,478 accumulated public votes, Team Harlem & Wang Feng emerged as the winning team of the Battle of Glory, and was given the title of the "Golden Team". The episode was taped on 22 September 2015, at The Venetian Theatre.

 Colour key

Elimination chart

Overall
Artist's info

Result details

Team
Artist's info

Result details

Artists' appearances on earlier seasons or other talent shows
Tifa Chen appeared on the fourth season of Super Girl as one of the top 300 finalists.
Zhu Qiang sang in the blind auditions for season three, but failed to turn any chairs.
Beibei (then under the name of Li Zoujun) and Yang Baoxin were contestants on the second season of Chinese Idol. Both passed the auditions, but failed to be selected by the judges to join the group of top 65 contestants for the next round of the competition and were eliminated. Beibei also participated in season two, but failed to turn any chairs. Her performance was not broadcast on television. 
Lim Xu participated in the second season of Super Boy and emerged as one of the top 61 finalists. Xu then appeared on You Are the Music and was one of the top 6 finalists.
Leon Lee was a contestant on the seventh season of Australia's Got Talent, where he was eliminated in the semifinal.
Saya Chang was the winner of the fifth season of I'm Not a Star.
Sun Bolun (then under the name of Gary Sun Xiaoliang) and Usay Kawlu appeared on the seventh season of One Million Star, and finished in second and third place respectively. Sun also participated in the first season of Super Boy (also under the stage name of Sun Xiaoliang) and finished in sixth place of the Xi'an division. He later joined the Asian Wave and finished as one of the top 6 contestants.
Sharon Kwan was a contestant on the first season of Chinese Million Star, and went on to become the first ever winner of the show.
Ginny Kuo from Chenyo was a contestant on the fourth season of Super Idol, where she was eliminated in the Top 17.
Leonala Ling sang in the blind auditions for season two, but failed to turn any chairs. Her performance was not broadcast on television.

Ratings

CSM50 ratings

References

Season 4
2015 Chinese television seasons